NRG Esports is an American esports organization based in Los Angeles, California. It has rosters in Apex Legends, Clash Royale, Dragon Ball FighterZ, Fortnite, Gears of War, Hearthstone, Overwatch, Rocket League, Valorant, speedrunning and a number of streamers on the internet platform Twitch.

History 
The team was founded by Sacramento Kings co-owners Mark Mastrov and Andy Miller in November 2015.

In March 2016 NRG announced that Alex Rodriguez, Shaquille O'Neal and Jimmy Rollins were joining as investors.
On April 20, 2018, Tiesto was announced as an investor.

In August 2017, the Canadian esports company Northern Gaming was acquired by NRG. Northern Gaming's co-owners were rolled into NRG, making twitch streamer Sodapoppin a named advisor and co-owner.

In September 2019, it was announced that Hector "H3CZ" Rodriguez had joined as co-CEO, after another announcement the same day that Hector and the Immortals Gaming Club had parted ways.

On August 24, 2020, Tubefilter announced that NRG partnered with Shots Studios, a Los Angeles-based production and management company, for content production, social strategy, and merchandising.

Current divisions

Apex Legends
On February 11, 2019, NRG became one of the first organizations to sign a professional Apex Legends player with the signing of Coby "Dizzy" Meadows. The team signed Brandon "Aceu" Winn and Marshall "Mohr" Mohr in March and May, respectively, to round out its three-player squad. Dizzy competed in the first-ever Apex Legends Pro-Am, securing 1st place, the tournament's MVP award, and a $23,000 charitable donation to the V Foundation. Following the retirement of Dizzy in December 2019, the team picked up their new talent Joseph "Frexs" Sanchez in the beginning of January, about a month later. In July 23, 2022, after the ALGS 2022: Championship, Aidan "rocker" Grodin announced his departure from the team. On August 13, the team signed Dennis "Gilderson" Zachary as their third teammate.

Current roster

Overwatch

On August 3, NRG signed the members of the former Overwatch team Luminosity Gaming. NRG owns the Overwatch League team San Francisco Shock, whose roster is listed below. NRG owned an Overwatch Contenders team competing as the Shock's academy team up until May 8, 2019, when they withdrew their participation in the tournament.

Current roster

Rocket League
NRG Esports signed the Kings of Urban roster after a strong finish in their region in RLCS Season 1 in 2016. RLCS Season 2 saw NRG bow out of the RLCS finals after a loss to Flipsid3 Tactics, finishing 5-6th. In the off-season, GarrettG was picked up from his former team Orbit, replacing Sadjunior. This new roster achieved a 3rd-place finish in the RLCS Season 3 finals, losing out to the eventual champions in Northern Gaming. After a disappointing last-place finish in the RLCS Season 4 Finals, NRG dropped mainstay and fan-favorite Jacob for rookie prodigy jstn. With jstn, NRG came one goal away from becoming the Rocket League world champions in Season 5. After going undefeated in both regular season and the first two days of the RLCS tournament, NRG met Dignitas in the Grand Finals. Dignitas reset the bracket with a 4–1 win in the first best-of-seven, which meant one final series would crown the champs. In Game 7, NRG trailed by one goal in the final moments, but jstn scored a last-second goal to send the game into overtime, where they ultimately lost. NRG would continue to dominate RLCS regional play in seasons 6 and 7, only to fall short of expectations at both finals. Several days after the end of Season 7, NRG legend Fireburner announced he was stepping away from competitive Rocket League. Nearly a month later, it was announced that three-time RLCS champion Turbopolsa, a member of the same Dignitas team that defeated NRG for the world title in season 5, would replace Fireburner, becoming the first player to make a cross-region move from Europe to North America. Months after Turbopolsa's move to North America, NRG Esports would finally go on to win the Rocket League World Championship series on December 15, 2019, beating Renault Vitality in a seven-game Grand Finals with jstn scoring the winning goal in overtime. They would then drop Turbopolsa in order to sign SquishyMuffinz, a player coming from the recently disbanded team Cloud9. With this roster, they went on to win RLCS X North American Championship, and lose in the Grand Finals of Fall Major RLCS 11 to Team BDS. They qualified for the Winter Major as the number 1 seed from NA,they went 1-2 in groups and were placed in the lower bracket against the eventual runner ups Team Queso, which they lost. NRG failed to qualify for the Spring Major, this was the first time NRG failed to qualify for an RLCS international LAN,but they qualified for the RLCS 2021-2022 Finals wildcard in Fort Worth. Although they failed to qualify for the Spring Major they still had enough points to qualify for the Main Event in Fort Worth. Following Version 1's loss against Moist Esports, NRG qualified for the Main Event in Fort Worth as the 3rd seed from North America.

Current roster

Valorant
On 8 October 2020, NRG entered the Valorant scene. Officially signing Damian "Daps" Steele, Sam "s0m" Oh, and coach Chet Singh. NRG never found huge success within the Valorant scene, although consistently remaining as one of the top teams in North America. After being accepted into Riot Games' partnered leagues for 2023, NRG let go of their entire roster, deciding to build with only Sam "s0m" Oh from the old roster. Following the announcement, NRG signed the OpTic Gaming core of IGL Pujan "FNS" Mehta, Austin "crashies" Roberts, Victor "Victor" Wong, along with the addition of Ardis "ardiis" Svarenieks, who previously had a highly successful 2022 run with FunPlus Phoenix. They later signed Zander "thwifo" Kim as sixth man in December 2022, but parted ways in March 2023.

Current roster

Former divisions

Counter-Strike: Global Offensive 
On 23 January 2016, NRG entered CS:GO with signing the ex-Method roster. 11 months later on 19 December, NRG completely changed their roster. On 27 July 2017, Peter "ptr" Gurney, who was the only player remaining from the original roster, left the team, replaced by Bulgarian Cvetelin "CeRq" Dimitrov a month later. In March 2018, NRG won the iBUYPOWER Invitational Spring 2018, beating Team Liquid. NRG's second victory came 5 months later in August 2018, after winning IEM Shangai 2018. NRG defeated OpTic Gaming to win cs_summit 3 in November 2018. On 28 February 2019, NRG signed former Cloud9 and MiBR member Tarık "tarik" Çelik to replace Jacob "FugLy" Medina.

On 26 September 2019, the NRG roster was acquired by Evil Geniuses, ending the 4 year CS:GO campaign of the organization.

Dragon Ball FighterZ 
NRG entered the Dragon Ball FighterZ scene in 2018 with the signing of Eduardo "HookGangGod" Deno. His first win under the NRG banner was at Summit of Power 2018 where he took down SonicFox to take the title. Eduardo was also featured in his very own docuseries on Sony Crackle called "Hook'D". The 4-part series featured a cameo appearance from Shaquille O'Neal and debuted on July 27, 2018. NRG released HookGangGod on January 13, 2020.

Smite 
On September 1, 2016, NRG acquired defending Smite World Champions team Panthera. The team joined the organization following a hugely successful first 12 months; qualifying for Worlds as European runners up before dropping just 2 games on their way to the title. They followed this up by going 24–4 in the Spring split to qualify for the Dreamhack Masters in June, dominating the tournament and going undefeated 8–0 to be crowned Champions. The team has most recently won the 2016-2017 Smite World Champions. On December 13, 2018, NRG officially ended their Smite division.

Super Smash Bros. 
NRG signed New Jersey native Nairoby "Nairo" Quezada for their Super Smash Bros. division in August 2016. On July 2, 2020, NRG cut ties with Nairo after allegations that he had been engaged in a sexual relationship with a minor in April 2017, effectively ending the team's Super Smash Bros. division.

Table of championships

Awards and nominations

References

External links 
 

 
2015 establishments in California
Esports teams based in the United States
Counter-Strike teams
Gears of War teams
Defunct and inactive Overwatch teams
Super Smash Bros. player sponsors
Smite (video game) teams
Rocket League teams
Venture capital-funded esports teams
Former North American League of Legends Championship Series teams
Valorant teams
American Internet groups